Rodgers Okuse Okumu (born June 6, 1994) is Kenyan football winger currently in the ranks of Kenyan Premier League side Nairobi City Stars.

Club career

In October 2020 he was signed up by Nairobi City Stars
 after promotion to the Kenyan Premier League.

He made his top-flight bow on 4 Dec 2020 in Kasarani after coming on as a 59th-minute substitute against KCB. His maiden Premier League goal arrived on 2 March 2021 at the same Kasarani during a 2–0 win over Mathare United.

References

1994 births
Living people
Kenyan footballers
Kenyan Premier League players
Nairobi City Stars players